Rosa Palumbo (stage name, Rosita Contreras; March 15, 1913 – 1962), was an Argentine actress, singer and vedette. She had a career in theater and also made five films. In 1944, she formed the "Comedy Society of Rosita Contreras" and debuted as a comedic actress comedy in Una divorciada peligrosa, directed by Enrique Guastavino, followed by La novia perdida in the same year. Other works included Retazo and Al marido hay que seguirlo. In 1950. she became a member of the initial executive committee of the Ateneo Cultural Eva Perón.

Filmography 
 La canción que tú cantabas (1939)
 Noches de Carnaval (1938)
 Melodías porteñas (1937) ...Juanita
 Viento Norte (1937)
 Cadetes de San Martín (1937)

References

External links

1913 births
1962 deaths
Argentine film actresses
Argentine stage actresses
20th-century Argentine women singers
Argentine vedettes
Argentine impressionists (entertainers)
20th-century Argentine actresses